Union Town may refer to:
Union Town, California, former name of Arcata, California
Union Town, New Jersey
Union Town, New York
 [[Uniontown, Pennsylvania]
 Uniontown, Arkansas
Union Town (album), a studio album by The Nightwatchman